The name Kiko has been used for a total of eleven tropical cyclones worldwide:

In the Eastern Pacific:
 Hurricane Kiko (1983), paralleled the Mexican coastline
 Hurricane Kiko (1989), struck Baja California causing minor damage
 Hurricane Kiko (2001), stayed in the open ocean 
 Tropical Storm Kiko (2007), killed 15 people in Mexico without ever making landfall
 Hurricane Kiko (2013), never threatened land
 Hurricane Kiko (2019), long-lived tropical cyclone that stayed in the open ocean

In the Western Pacific:
 Typhoon Nari (2001) (T0116, 20W, Kiko), struck Ryukyu Islands, Taiwan and China
 Typhoon Khanun (2005) (T0515, 15W, Kiko), struck China
 Typhoon Morakot (T0908, 09W, Kiko), a 2009 storm that struck Ryukyu Islands, Taiwan and China
 Tropical Storm Mangkhut (2013) (T1310, 10W, Kiko)
 Tropical Storm Guchol (2017) (T1717, 19W, Kiko)
 Typhoon Chanthu (2021) (T2114, 19W, Kiko) - a powerful Category 5 super typhoon

Pacific hurricane set index articles
Pacific typhoon set index articles